North Great River is a hamlet and census-designated place (CDP) in the Town of Islip, in Suffolk County, on Long Island, in New York, United States. The CDP population was 4,001 at the 2010 census.
The hamlet is served by the Islip Terrace Post Office (11752).

Geography

Demographics

As of the census of 2000, there were 2,129 people, 1,156 households, and 996 families residing in the CDP. The population density was 1,719.8 per square mile (665.3/km2). There were 1,167 housing units at an average density of 510.8/sq mi (197.6/km2). The racial makeup of this CDP was 97.73% White, 1.58% African American, 0.08% Native American, 1.25% Asian, 0.03% Pacific Islander, 0.27% from other races, and 1.09% from two or more races. Hispanic or Latino of any race were 1.31% of the population.

There were 1,156 households, out of which 41.3% had children under the age of 18 living with them, 73.2% were married couples living together, 8.9% had a female householder with no husband present, and 13.8% were non-families. 10.6% of all households were made up of individuals, and 4.3% had someone living alone who was 65 years of age or older. The average household size was 3.40 and the average family size was 3.64.

In the CDP, the population was spread out, with 27.9% under the age of 18, 7.1% from 18 to 24, 32.4% from 25 to 44, 22.2% from 45 to 64, and 10.4% who were 65 years of age or older. The median age was 36 years. For every 100 females, there were 98.1 males. For every 100 females age 18 and over, there were 96.3 males.

The median income for a household in the CDP was $96,000, and the median income for a family was $127,385. Males had a median income of $132,911 versus $41,270 for females. The per capita income for the CDP was $102,489. About 1.3% of families and 0.8% of the population were below the poverty line, including 2.3% of those under age 18 and 8.9% of those age 65 or over.

Kevin Brunner is also rumored to have been reared in North Great River, but this has always been highly debated amongst scholars.

Education 
North Great River is located primarily within the East Islip Union Free School District, although a small portion of the northwestern corner of the hamlet is within the Central Islip Union Free School District. Students who reside within the hamlet and attend public schools will go to school in one of these two districts, depending on where in the hamlet they live.

References

Islip (town), New York
Census-designated places in New York (state)
Census-designated places in Suffolk County, New York